Jatuncunca (possibly from Quechua hatun big, kunka throat, gullet, "big throat" or big gullet"), Janyaraju or Jangyraju is a mountain in the Cordillera Blanca of the Andes of Peru, about  high. It is located in the Ancash Region, Huaraz Province, on the border of the districts Independencia and Tarica. Jatuncunca lies west of Ocshapalca.

References

Mountains of Peru
Mountains of Ancash Region